The Leapster Explorer is a handheld console developed and marketed by LeapFrog Enterprises as the third generation of the successful Leapster series at the same time as the Didj2 console. It is aimed at children aged 4 to 9.

Unlike previous systems in the Leapster series, the Explorer is not compatible with Leapster/L-MAX cartridges, but it can run Didj cartridges.

Hardware
The Leapster Explorer is a Linux device powered by an ARM9-based processor clocked at 393 MHz with 64 MB DDR SDRAM, 512 MB user storage, and a Giantplus touchscreen display.

Like the Didj and unlike the Leapster2, the console has also been a subject to user modification as it runs on an embedded Linux kernel. There has been a number of homebrew software written and/or ported for the device.

References

List of games licensed
Barbie
Brave
Bubble Guppies
Cars 2
Clifford the Big Red Dog
Disney Fairies
Disney Princess
Doc McStuffins
Doodle Jump
Dora the Explorer
Finding Nemo
Finding Dory
Frozen
Globe: Earth Adventures
The Good Dinosaur
Hot Wheels
I SpyJake and the Never Land PiratesJewel TrainKidz BopThe Little MermaidThe Magic School BusMinnie Mouse BowtiqueMonsters UniversityMoshi MonstersMy Little Pony: Friendship is MagicNi Hao, Kai-LanOctonautsPAW PatrolPet Pals 2Phineas and FerbPixar PalsPlanesPocoyoScooby-DooSesame StreetSpongeBob SquarePantsTangledTeam UmizoomiTeenage Mutant Ninja TurtlesTest It 2Toy Story 3TurboWallykazam!''

External links
 Leapster Explorer

2010 introductions
ARM-based video game consoles
Backward-compatible video game consoles
Educational toys
Electronic toys
Embedded Linux
Handheld game consoles
Linux-based devices
Seventh-generation video game consoles